Kenny Leon Veal, Jr. (born May 26, 1989) is an American football defensive back for the Carolina Cobras of the National Arena League (NAL). He played college football at Thomas More College in Kentucky and attended Hamilton High School in Hamilton, Ohio. He has also been a member of the Nashville Venom, Cleveland Gladiators,
Wichita Falls Nighthawks and Green Bay Blizzard.

Early life
Veal attended Hamilton High School. He was selected to play in the Big 33 Football Classic.

College career
Veal played for the Toledo Rockets from 2008 to 2009 and helped the Rockets to 8 wins. Veal played in 22 games with the Rockets and started 5 at cornerback. In 2010, Veal transferred to Grand Valley State where he redshirted as a junior. As a redshirt junior, Veal played in 11 games and started 7 at cornerback. In 2012, Veal transferred to Thomas More College where he started for the Saints as a senior.

Statistics
Sources:

Professional career

Nashville Venom
Veal signed with the Nashville Venom in 2014. Veal helped guide the Venom to a victory in PIFL Cup III. Veal returned to the Venom in 2015. Veal was named an All-PIFL selection in 2015.

Cleveland Gladiators
Veal was assigned to the Cleveland Gladiators on July 30, 2015, but never appeared in a game for the Gladiators. On August 16, 2015, Veal was placed on inactive reserve. On May 13, 2016, Veal was placed on reassignment.

Wichita Falls Nighthawks
On May 19, 2016, Veal signed with the Wichita Falls Nighthawks.

Cleveland Gladiators
On April 14, 2017, Veal was assigned to the Gladiators. On April 19, 2017, Veal was placed on reassignment. On June 9, 2017, Veal re-joined the Gladiators.

Green Bay Blizzard
On May 4, 2017, Veal signed with the Green Bay Blizzard.

Jacksonville Sharks
Veal signed with the Jacksonville Sharks in December 2017.

Columbus Destroyers
On March 7, 2019, Veal was assigned to the Columbus Destroyers. On April 13, 2019, he was placed on recallable reassignment and became a free agent.

Carolina Cobras
On May 5, 2021, Veal signed with the Carolina Cobras of the National Arena League (NAL). On June 10, 2021, Veal was released by the Cobras.

Jacksonville Sharks (second stint)
On June 24, 2021, Veal signed with the Jacksonville Sharks of the National Arena League (NAL) for his second stint with the team. On March 3, 2022, Veal re-signed with the Sharks for the 2022 season.

Albany Empire
On May 24, 2022, Veal was traded to the Albany Empire of the National Arena League (2022).

Carolina Cobras (second stint)
On January 9, 2023, Veal signed with the Carolina Cobras of the National Arena League (NAL) for his second stint with the team.

References

External links
 Toledo Rockets bio
 Thomas More College Saints bio

Living people
1989 births
Players of American football from Ohio
People from Hamilton, Ohio
American football defensive backs
Toledo Rockets football players
Grand Valley State Lakers football players
Thomas More Saints football players
Nashville Venom players
Cleveland Gladiators players
Wichita Falls Nighthawks players
Green Bay Blizzard players
Jacksonville Sharks players
Columbus Destroyers players